Kumamon  is a mascot created by the government of Kumamoto Prefecture, Japan. It was created in 2010 for a campaign created to draw tourists to the region after the Kyushu Shinkansen line opened. Kumamon subsequently became nationally popular, and in late 2011, was voted top in a nationwide survey of mascots, collectively known as yuru-chara, garnering over 280,000 votes.  Following his success in the contest, Kumamoto earned  in merchandising revenue for the first half of 2012, after having only earned  throughout all of 2011. Kumamon enjoys tremendous popularity throughout the world.

Economic impact 
In just two years, Kumamon has generated US$1.2 billion in economic benefits for his region, including tourism and product sales, as well as US$90 million worth of publicity, according to a recent Bank of Japan study. Sales of Kumamon items have reached ¥29.3 billion in 2012, up from ¥2.5 billion in 2011.

The Bank of Japan also estimated that Kumamon generated  in revenue during a two-year period starting from 2011.

Success 
A large part of Kumamon's success can be attributed to its cuteness. The unusual marketing strategy of free licensing is also behind Kumamon's commercial success, since the Kumamoto prefecture grants usage rights for free to anyone as long as their products promote goods and services from the prefecture. Furthermore, in 2018, the Kumamoto prefecture decided to allow foreign businesses to use Kumamon, aiming to expand Kumamon to the world.

Cultural impact
This mascot has a minor cameo in the 2014 video game Yo-Kai Watch 2, and made an appearance in Yo-kai Watch: The Movie, following the main characters (Whisper, Nate, and Jibanyan) around. It also gained internet popularity when images of Kumamon, usually around large fires, were captioned with "Why? For the glory of Satan, of course!". The Kumamoto Prefecture has taken this well, but has more carefully restricted official photography of the mascot.

Since 3 September 2018, Kumamon has embraced a new identity as a YouTuber. Videos in Japanese have been uploaded onto its YouTube account every Monday.

Retail sales

See also
Funassyi
Hikonyan
Choruru
Kigurumi

References

External links

 
  
 
Kumamon on Facebook (in Japanese)

Advertising characters
Bear mascots
Fictional bears
Kumamoto Prefecture
Japanese mascots
Mascots introduced in 2010